XHMX-FM is a radio station in Tapachula, Chiapas. Owned by Radio S.A., XHMX broadcasts on 97.9 FM and is known as Máxima.

History
XHMX received its concession on May 16, 1978 and was originally owned by Blanca Julia Águilar Trujillo. The Águilar Trujillo family was involved in the ownership of other radio stations in Chiapas; it founded XHKR-FM in Tuxtla Gutiérrez, which remains a sister to XHMX.

References

External links
 Official website

Spanish-language radio stations
Radio stations in Chiapas